This is a list of Brazilian television related events from 1981.

Events
August 19 - SBT launches.

Debuts

Television shows

1970s
Turma da Mônica (1976–present)
Sítio do Picapau Amarelo (1977–1986)

Births
26 February - Miá Mello, actress & comedian
28 March - Beto Marden, TV host, singer & actor
29 May - Fernanda Motta, model, actress & TV host
6 July - Marco Antônio Gimenez, actor, model & TV host
1 November - Thiago Fragoso, actor & singer

Deaths

See also
1981 in Brazil
List of Brazilian films of 1981